Straton Falls is a waterfall in Delaware County, New York. It is located southwest of Roxbury on an unnamed creek.

References

Waterfalls of New York (state)
Landforms of Delaware County, New York
Tourist attractions in Delaware County, New York